Craig Marquis (born March 14, 1985) is an American poker player from Arlington, Texas, and a final table participant in the 2008 World Series of Poker Main Event.

He had three prior WSOP cashes, one in 2008 and two in 2007.

At the 2008 WSOP Main Event final table, Marquis was the first player to be eliminated, starting the table with 10,210,000 in tournament chips. The flop came  giving Montgomery a pair of aces with Marquis making a set of sevens. However, the turn and river ran  giving Montgomery a straight which eliminated Marquis in ninth place, earning him $900,670.

At the 2010 World Series of Poker, Marquis cashed twice.  As of 2010, his total live tournament winnings exceed $990,000. His six cashes at the WSOP account for $976,376 of those winnings.

References

American poker players
1985 births
Living people